Swimming was contested at the 1982 Asian Games in Talkatora Swimming Pool, New Delhi, from 21–29 November 1982.

Medalists

Men

Women

Medal table

References 

 New Straits Times, 24–29 September 1982
 Sports 123: Asian Games

External links 
 Olympic Council of Asia

 
1982 Asian Games events
1982
Asian Games
1982 Asian Games